The Shadow Ministry of John Howard was the opposition Coalition shadow ministry of Australia from 30 January 1995 to 11 March 1996, opposing Paul Keating's Australian Labor Party ministry.

The shadow cabinet is a group of senior Opposition spokespeople who form an alternative Cabinet to the government's, whose members shadow or mark each individual Minister or portfolio of the Government.

John Howard resumed his position as Leader of the Opposition upon his return as leader of the Liberal Party of Australia on 30 January 1995, and appointed a new Shadow Cabinet.

Shadow Cabinet
The following were members of the Shadow Cabinet:

Outer shadow ministry

References

Liberal Party of Australia
National Party of Australia
Howard II
Opposition of Australia